William Joseph Jesko (December 24, 1915 – October 21, 1961) was an American professional basketball player. He played college basketball for the University of Pittsburgh where he was the team captain in his senior year in 1936–37. Jesko then played in the National Basketball League for two years for the Pittsburgh Pirates and averaged 5.7 points per game. He served in World War II, then coached high school basketball until 1961, when he unexpectedly died in his home.

References

 
 

1915 births
1961 deaths
American men's basketball players
United States Army personnel of World War II
Basketball players from Pittsburgh
Forwards (basketball)
Guards (basketball)
High school basketball coaches in the United States
Pittsburgh Panthers men's basketball players
Pittsburgh Pirates (NBL) players